Sternechus is a genus of true weevils in the beetle family Curculionidae. There are more than 50 described species in Sternechus.

Species
These 54 species belong to the genus Sternechus:

 Sternechus armatus (Casey, 1895)
 Sternechus aurocinctus Champion & G.C., 1902
 Sternechus bicaudatus Champion & G.C., 1902
 Sternechus bicinctus Champion & G.C., 1902
 Sternechus bifasciatus Champion & G.C., 1902
 Sternechus brevicollis Champion & G.C., 1902
 Sternechus breyeri Brèthes, 1910
 Sternechus caliginosus Boheman, 1843
 Sternechus candidus Guérin-Méneville, 1844
 Sternechus contiguus Hustache, 1939
 Sternechus continuus Champion & G.C., 1902
 Sternechus costatus Blanchard & E., 1837-44
 Sternechus decemmaculatus Guérin-Méneville, 1844
 Sternechus denticollis Hustache, 1939
 Sternechus denudatus Boheman, 1843
 Sternechus egenus Boheman, 1843
 Sternechus exellens Heyne, A.-Taschenberg & O., 1908
 Sternechus extortus Chevrolat, 1833
 Sternechus fasciatus Mendes, 1962
 Sternechus firmus Boheman, 1843
 Sternechus foveolatus Champion & G.C., 1902
 Sternechus fuscoaeneus Boheman, 1843
 Sternechus fuscomaculatus Champion & G.C., 1902
 Sternechus gonopterus Mendes, 1957
 Sternechus granulosus Rosado Neto, 1977
 Sternechus guerini Boheman, 1843
 Sternechus guerinoides Mendes, 1962
 Sternechus guttatus Mendes, 1957
 Sternechus hamatus Boheman, 1835
 Sternechus inconditus Boheman, 1843
 Sternechus insularis Boheman, 1843
 Sternechus irroratus Boheman, 1843
 Sternechus laevirostris Hustache, 1939
 Sternechus mesosternalis Mendes, 1962
 Sternechus mrazi Voss, 1934
 Sternechus nitidus Champion & G.C., 1902
 Sternechus paludatus (Casey, 1895) (bean stalk weevil)
 Sternechus pectoralis Suffrian & E., 1872
 Sternechus pinguis (Fabricius & J.C., 1787)
 Sternechus pollinosus Marshall, 1952
 Sternechus reticulatus Champion & G.C., 1902
 Sternechus russatoides Mendes, 1962
 Sternechus russatus Boheman, 1835
 Sternechus sahlbergi Schoenherr, 1843
 Sternechus spinipes Champion & G.C., 1902
 Sternechus sublaevicollis Hustache, 1939
 Sternechus subsignatus Boheman, 1835
 Sternechus trachyptomus Schoenherr, 1826
 Sternechus triangulifer Rosado Neto, 1977
 Sternechus tuberculatus Boheman, 1835
 Sternechus tuberosus Boheman, 1843
 Sternechus uncipennis Schoenherr, 1835
 Sternechus vicinus Fleutiaux, Sallé & A., 1889
 Sternechus vulgaris Mendes, 1962

References

Further reading

 
 
 

Molytinae
Articles created by Qbugbot